Acacia chamaeleon is a shrub belonging to the genus Acacia and the subgenus Phyllodineae. It is native to an area along the south coast in the Great Southern, Wheatbelt and the Goldfields-Esperance regions of Western Australia.

It blooms from May to December and produces yellow flowers.

See also
 List of Acacia species

References

chamaeleon
Acacias of Western Australia
Taxa named by Bruce Maslin